Thomas Arthur Wardall (19 April 1862 – 20 December 1932) was an English first-class cricketer, who played forty five matches for Yorkshire County Cricket Club from 1884 to 1894.  He also played first-class games for the North of England in 1884, and L Hall's Yorkshire XI in 1891.  He played in a total of 47 first-class matches, and also appeared for the Yorkshire Second XI in 1892.

Wardall was a right-handed batsman, who scored 1,163 runs at 15.10, with a best of 112 against Liverpool and District.  He scored three centuries and held thirty catches in the field.  Ward took thirty wickets with his right arm slow bowling, with a best analysis of 5 for 13 against Surrey, his only five wicket haul.

References

External links
 

1862 births
1932 deaths
Yorkshire cricketers
People from Eston
English cricketers
North v South cricketers